NATIVELAND is an annual music festival in Lagos, Nigeria, and organized by The Native. The platform was established to bring together the best of pop culture, music, art, food, style, sports, and education in the Nigerian entertainment industry.

History
NATIVELAND is produced and organized by	The Native. It was created to bring together the best of pop culture, music, art, food, style, sports, and education in the Nigerian entertainment industry. The event is held annually at Muri Okunola Park, in Lagos.

2016: First edition
On 22 December 2016, the first edition was held and powered by Ndani TV. The concert was headlined by Skepta, and Burna Boy and featured guess performances from, Ycee, Ajebutter 22, Maleek Berry, Fresh L, DAP The Contract, Odunsi (The Engine), Cruel Santino, and Lady Donli. At the first edition, the music group DRB LasGidi, united on stage.

2017: Second edition
On 22 December 2017, the second edition was held, and headlined by Kojo Funds, Davido, Nonso Amadi, Maleek Berry, Burna Boy, Tekno, Not3s, Mayorkun and Yxng Bane, with guess performances from, Fasina, Fresh L, Mobblanta, No Politics Mob, Kazeem Twins, Yinka Bernie, AYLØ, Lady Donli, Barelyanyhook, Dice Ailes, Ladipoe, Prettyboy D-O, DJ Aye, Wavy The Creator, Odunsi, Blackmagic, Santi, Ajebutter22, BOJ, and SDC.

2018: Third edition
The third edition was held with Odunsi, PrettyBoy D-O, and Santi as special guests, with additional performances from Wande Coal, Runtown, Sababii, Falana, and Teni.

2019: Fourth edition
At the fourth edition, the festival added a day for panels titled NATIVE HOUSE, which invited music industry insiders from various sects and artists from Nigeria and the African Diaspora. To discuss topics ranging from the migration of contemporary African music, visual art, and the international music interest in African music. The festival feature guess performs from Naira Marley, Santi, Rema, Lady Donli, Tems, Joeboy, Fireboy DML, Buju, Gigi Atlantis, SOMADINA, Cuppy, Maison 2500, DJ Femo and more. With additional music provided by NATIVE Sound System resident DJs Bristar and Vvada. Burna Boy and Koffee did not perform, due to the security at the VIP entrance was breached by fans.

2021: Fifth edition
On 22 December 2021, NSS hosted the fifth edition of NATIVELAND, titled NATIV5 at Harbour Point Marquee. To celebrate the fifth anniversary of The Native. The music concert was headlined by Rema, Amaarae , Styl-Plus, Teezee, SGaWD, and Lojay, with guess performances from, Odunsi, Ayra Starr, Tems, Wale Davies, and Ladipoe.

See also
The Native
NATIVE Sound System
NATIVE Sound Radio

References

2016 establishments in Nigeria
Festivals established in 2016
Music festivals in Lagos
Electronic music festivals in Nigeria
Festivals in Lagos
Music festivals in Nigeria